The province of Tarlac has 511 barangays comprising its 17 towns and 1 city.

Barangays

References

.
Tarlac